Globigerina is a genus of planktonic Foraminifera, in the order of Rotaliida. It has populated the world's oceans since the Middle Jurassic.

Globigerina ooze
Vast areas of the ocean floor are covered with Globigerina ooze, dominated by the foraminiferous shells of Globigerina and other Globigerinina. The name was originally applied to mud collected from the bottom of the Atlantic Ocean when planning the location of the first transatlantic telegraph cables and it was mainly composed of the shells of Globigerina bulloides.

Description

Globigerina has a globose, trochospirally enrolled test composed of spherical to ovate but not radially elongate chambers that enlarge rapidly as added, commonly with only three to five in the final whorl. The test (or shell) wall is calcareous, perforate, with cylindrical pores. During life the surface has numerous long slender spines that are broken on dead or fossil shells, the short blunt remnants resulting in a hispid surface. The aperture a high umbilical arch that may be bordered by an imperforate rim or narrow lip. No secondary apertures.

Species
Globigerina includes the following species (extinct species marked with a dagger, †)

Globigerina bulloides d'Orbigny, 1826
Globigerina compacta Hofker, 1956 †
Globigerina cretacea d'Orbigny, 1840 † (later reclassified as Muricohedbergella delrioensis)
Globigerina dubia Egger, 1857 †
Globigerina falconensis Blow, 1959
Globigerina hexagona Natland, 1938
Globigerina paratriloculinoides Hofker, 1956 †
Globigerina paravenezuelana Hofker, 1956 †
Globigerina protoreticulata Hofker, 1956 †
Globigerina pseudocretacea Hofker, 1956 †
Globigerina stainforthi Hofker, 1956 †
Globigerina supracretacea Hofker, 1956 †

References

 Alfred R. Loeblich Jr. and Helen Tappan, 1964. Sarcodina Chiefly "Thecamoebians" and Foraminiferida; Treatise on Invertebrate Paleontology, Part C Protista 2. Geological Society of America and University of Kansas Press.
 Alfred R. Loeblich Jr. and Helen Tappan, 1988. Forminiferal Genera and their Classification. . GSI E-book

Rotaliida genera
Fossil taxa described in 1826
Extant Jurassic first appearances